In mathematics a topological space is called countably compact if every countable open cover has a finite subcover.

Equivalent definitions
A topological space X is called countably compact if it satisfies any of the following equivalent conditions:

(1) Every countable open cover of X has a finite subcover.
(2) Every infinite set A in X has an ω-accumulation point in X.
(3) Every sequence in X has an accumulation point in X.
(4) Every countable family of closed subsets of X with an empty intersection has a finite subfamily with an empty intersection.

(1)  (2):  Suppose (1) holds and A is an infinite subset of X without -accumulation point.  By taking a subset of A if necessary, we can assume that A is countable.
Every  has an open neighbourhood  such that  is finite (possibly empty), since x is not an ω-accumulation point. For every finite subset F of A define .

(2)  (3):  Suppose (2) holds, and let  be a sequence in X.  If the sequence has a value x that occurs infinitely many times, that value is an accumulation point of the sequence.  Otherwise, every value in the sequence occurs only finitely many times and the set  is infinite and so has an ω-accumulation point x.  That x is then an accumulation point of the sequence, as is easily checked.

This contradiction proves (1).

(4)  (1): Conditions (1) and (4) are easily seen to be equivalent by taking complements.

Examples
The first uncountable ordinal (with the order topology) is an example of a countably compact space that is not compact.

Properties
 Every compact space is countably compact.
A countably compact space is compact if and only if it is Lindelöf.
Every countably compact space is limit point compact.
For T1 spaces, countable compactness and limit point compactness are equivalent.
Every sequentially compact space is countably compact.  The converse does not hold.  For example, the product of continuum-many closed intervals  with the product topology is compact and hence countably compact; but it is not sequentially compact.
For first-countable spaces, countable compactness and sequential compactness are equivalent.
For metrizable spaces, countable compactness, sequential compactness, limit point compactness and compactness are all equivalent.
The example of the set of all real numbers with the standard topology shows that neither local compactness nor σ-compactness nor paracompactness imply countable compactness.
Closed subspaces of a countably compact space are countably compact.
The continuous image of a countably compact space is countably compact.
Every countably compact space is pseudocompact.
In a countably compact space, every locally finite family of nonempty subsets is finite.
Every countably compact paracompact space is compact.
 Every countably compact Hausdorff first-countable space is regular.
Every normal countably compact space is collectionwise normal.
The product of a compact space and a countably compact space is countably compact.
The product of two countably compact spaces need not be countably compact.

See also
Sequentially compact space
Compact space
Limit point compact
Lindelöf space

Notes

References

 
 
 
 

Properties of topological spaces
Compactness (mathematics)